X14 is a series of two-car electric multiple units operated by Statens Järnvägar (SJ) of Sweden as local trains. They were built in 18 copies by Asea Brown Boveri between 1994 and 1995, and based on the older X12-series. In addition two X12 units was converted to X14. It is operated by SJ, Västtrafik and Tåg i Bergslagen (TiB).

References

External links
Järnväg.net on X14 
Fagersta-posten om X14 

ASEA multiple units
X14
X14
1994 establishments in Sweden
15 kV AC multiple units